1 is One is a 1956 picture book written and illustrated by Tasha Tudor. The book is a counting book going up to the number 20. The book was a recipient of a 1957 Caldecott Honor for its illustrations.

References

1956 children's books
American picture books
Caldecott Honor-winning works